In mathematics, a continued fraction is an expression obtained through an iterative process of representing a number as the sum of its integer part and the reciprocal of another number, then writing this other number as the sum of its integer part and another reciprocal, and so on. In a finite continued fraction (or terminated continued fraction), the iteration/recursion is terminated after finitely many steps by using an integer in lieu of another continued fraction. In contrast, an infinite continued fraction is an infinite expression. In either case, all integers in the sequence, other than the first, must be positive. The integers  are called the coefficients or terms of the continued fraction.

It is generally assumed that the numerator of all of the fractions is 1. If arbitrary values and/or functions are used in place of one or more of the numerators or the integers in the denominators, the resulting expression is a generalized continued fraction. When it is necessary to distinguish the first form from generalized continued fractions, the former may be called a simple or regular continued fraction, or said to be in canonical form.

Continued fractions have a number of remarkable properties related to the Euclidean algorithm for integers or real numbers. The numerical value of an infinite continued fraction is irrational; it is defined from its infinite sequence of integers as the limit of a sequence of values for finite continued fractions. Each finite continued fraction of the sequence is obtained by using a finite prefix of the infinite continued fraction's defining sequence of integers. Moreover, every irrational number  is the value of a unique infinite regular continued fraction, whose coefficients can be found using the non-terminating version of the Euclidean algorithm applied to the incommensurable values  and 1. This way of expressing real numbers (rational and irrational) is called their continued fraction representation.

The term continued fraction may also refer to representations of rational functions, arising in their analytic theory. For this use of the term, see Padé approximation and Chebyshev rational functions.

Motivation and notation
Consider, for example, the rational number , which is around 4.4624. As a first approximation, start with 4, which is the integer part; .

This can be represented by the abbreviated notation  = [4; 2, 6, 7]. (It is customary to replace only the first comma by a semicolon.) Some older textbooks use all commas in the -tuple, for example, [4, 2, 6, 7].

If the starting number is rational, then this process exactly parallels the Euclidean algorithm applied to the numerator and denominator of the number. In particular, it must terminate and produce a finite continued fraction representation of the number. The sequence of integers that occur in this representation is the sequence of successive quotients computed by the Euclidean algorithm. If the starting number is irrational, then the process continues indefinitely. This produces a sequence of approximations, all of which are rational numbers, and these converge to the starting number as a limit. This is the (infinite) continued fraction representation of the number. Examples of continued fraction representations of irrational numbers are:
  . The pattern repeats indefinitely with a period of 6.
  . The pattern repeats indefinitely with a period of 3 except that 2 is added to one of the terms in each cycle.
  . No pattern has ever been found in this representation.
  . The golden ratio, the irrational number that is the "most difficult" to approximate rationally .
  . The Euler–Mascheroni constant, which is expected but not known to be irrational, and whose continued fraction has no apparent pattern.

Continued fractions are, in some ways, more "mathematically natural" representations of a real number than other representations such as decimal representations, and they have several desirable properties:
 The continued fraction representation for a real number is finite if and only if it is a rational number. In contrast, the decimal representation of a rational number may be finite, for example , or infinite with a repeating cycle, for example 
 Every rational number has an essentially unique simple continued fraction representation. Each rational can be represented in exactly two ways, since . Usually the first, shorter one is chosen as the canonical representation.
 The simple continued fraction representation of an irrational number is unique. (However, additional representations are possible when using generalized continued fractions; see below.) 
 The real numbers whose continued fraction eventually repeats are precisely the quadratic irrationals. For example, the repeating continued fraction  is the golden ratio, and the repeating continued fraction  is the square root of 2. In contrast, the decimal representations of quadratic irrationals are apparently random. The square roots of all (positive) integers that are not perfect squares are quadratic irrationals, and hence are unique periodic continued fractions.
 The successive approximations generated in finding the continued fraction representation of a number, that is, by truncating the continued fraction representation, are in a certain sense (described below) the "best possible".

Basic formula 
A (generalized) continued fraction is an expression of the form

where ai and bi can be any complex numbers.

When bi = 1 for all i the expression is called a simple continued fraction.
When the expression contains finitely many terms, it is called a finite continued fraction.
When the expression contains infinitely many terms, it is called an infinite continued fraction.
When the terms eventually repeat from some point onwards, the expression is called a periodic continued fraction.

Thus, all of the following illustrate valid finite simple continued fractions:

For simple continued fractions of the form

the  term can be calculated using the following recursive formula:

 

where  and 

From which it can be understood that the  sequence stops if .

Calculating continued fraction representations
Consider a real number .
Let  and let
.

If the difference is 0, stop; otherwise find the reciprocal of the difference and repeat. The procedure will halt if and only if  is rational. This process can be efficiently implemented using the Euclidean algorithm when the number is rational. The table below shows an implementation of this procedure for the number 3.245, resulting in the continued fraction expansion [3; 4,12,4].

{| class="wikitable"
|-
|+ Find the simple continued fraction for 
|-
!Step
!RealNumber
!Integerpart
!Fractionalpart
!Simplified
!Reciprocalof 
|-
!1
|
|
|
|
|
|-
!2
|
|
|
|
|
|-
!3
|
|
|
|
|
|-
!4
|
|
|
|
|colspan="2"|STOP
|-
| colspan="7" style="text-align:right;" | Continued fraction form for 
= 
|}

Notations
The integers ,  etc., are called the coefficients or terms of the continued fraction. One can abbreviate the continued fraction

in the notation of Carl Friedrich Gauss

or as

,

or in the notation of Pringsheim as

or in related notations as

or

Sometimes angle brackets are used, like this:

The semicolon in the square and angle bracket notations is sometimes replaced by a comma.

One may also define infinite simple continued fractions as limits:

Finite continued fractions
Every finite continued fraction represents a rational number, and every rational number can be represented in precisely two different ways as a finite continued fraction, with the conditions that the first coefficient is an integer and the other coefficients are positive integers. These two representations agree except in their final terms. In the longer representation the final term in the continued fraction is 1; the shorter representation drops the final 1, but increases the new final term by 1. The final element in the short representation is therefore always greater than 1, if present. In symbols:

.
.

Reciprocals
The continued fraction representations of a positive rational number and its reciprocal are identical except for a shift one place left or right depending on whether the number is less than or greater than one respectively. In other words, the numbers represented by

For instance if  is an integer and  then

If  then

The last number that generates the remainder of the continued fraction is the same for both  and its reciprocal.

For example,

Infinite continued fractions and convergents  

Every infinite continued fraction is irrational, and every irrational number can be represented in precisely one way as an infinite continued fraction.

An infinite continued fraction representation for an irrational number is useful because its initial segments provide rational approximations to the number. These rational numbers are called the convergents of the continued fraction. The larger a term is in the continued fraction, the closer the corresponding convergent is to the irrational number being approximated. Numbers like π have occasional large terms in their continued fraction, which makes them easy to approximate with rational numbers. Other numbers like e have only small terms early in their continued fraction, which makes them more difficult to approximate rationally. The golden ratio Φ has terms equal to 1 everywhere—the smallest values possible—which makes Φ the most difficult number to approximate rationally. In this sense, therefore, it is the "most irrational" of all irrational numbers. Even-numbered convergents are smaller than the original number, while odd-numbered ones are larger.

For a continued fraction , the first four convergents (numbered 0 through 3) are

.

The numerator of the third convergent is formed by multiplying the numerator of the second convergent by the third coefficient, and adding the numerator of the first convergent. The denominators are formed similarly. Therefore, each convergent can be expressed explicitly in terms of the continued fraction as the ratio of certain multivariate polynomials called continuants.

,
.

The successive convergents are given by the formula

.

Thus to incorporate a new term into a rational approximation, only the two previous convergents are necessary. The initial "convergents" (required for the first two terms) are 0⁄1 and 1⁄0. For example, here are the convergents for [0;1,5,2,2].

{| class="wikitable"
|- align="right"
! 
| −2|| −1|| 0 || 1 || 2 || 3 || 4
|- align="right"
! 
|   ||   || 0 || 1 || 5 || 2 || 2
|- align="right"
! 
| 0 || 1 || 0 || 1 || 5 || 11 || 27
|- align="right"
! 
| 1 || 0 || 1 || 1 || 6 || 13 || 32
|}

When using the Babylonian method to generate successive approximations to the square root of an integer, if one starts with the lowest integer as first approximant, the rationals generated all appear in the list of convergents for the continued fraction. Specifically, the approximants will appear on the convergents list in positions 0, 1, 3, 7, 15, ... , , ... Comparing the convergents with the approximants derived from the Babylonian method:

{| class="wikitable"
|- align="right"
! 
| −2|| −1|| 0 || 1 || 2 || 3 || 4 || 5 || 6 || 7
|- align="right"
! 
|   ||   || 1 || 1 || 2 || 1 || 2 || 1 || 2 || 1
|- align="right"
! 
| 0 || 1 || 1 || 2 || 5 || 7 || 19 || 26 || 71 || 97
|- align="right"
! 
| 1 || 0 || 1 || 1 || 3 || 4 || 11 || 15 || 41 || 56
|}

Properties
A Baire space is a topological space on infinite sequences of natural numbers. The infinite continued fraction provides a homeomorphism from the Baire space to the space of irrational real numbers (with the subspace topology inherited from the usual topology on the reals). The infinite continued fraction also provides a map between the quadratic irrationals and the dyadic rationals, and from other irrationals to the set of infinite strings of binary numbers (i.e. the Cantor set); this map is called the Minkowski question mark function. The mapping has interesting self-similar fractal properties; these are given by the modular group, which is the subgroup of Möbius transformations having integer values in the transform. Roughly speaking, continued fraction convergents can be taken to be Möbius transformations acting on the (hyperbolic) upper half-plane; this is what leads to the fractal self-symmetry.

The limit probability distribution of the coefficients in the continued fraction expansion of a random variable uniformly distributed in (0, 1) is the Gauss–Kuzmin distribution.

Some useful theorems

Theorem 1. For any positive real number 

Theorem 2.

Theorem 3. If the th convergent to a continued fraction is /, then

Corollary 1: Each convergent is in its lowest terms (for if  and  had a nontrivial common divisor it would divide , which is impossible).

Corollary 2: The difference between successive convergents is a fraction whose numerator is unity:

Corollary 3: The continued fraction is equivalent to a series of alternating terms:

Corollary 4: The matrix

has determinant plus or minus one, and thus belongs to the group of
 unimodular matrices .

Theorem 4. Each (th) convergent is nearer to a subsequent (th) convergent than any preceding (th) convergent is. In symbols, if the th convergent is taken to be , then

for all .

Theorem 5.

Corollary 1: A convergent is nearer to the limit of the continued fraction than any fraction whose denominator is less than that of the convergent.

Corollary 2: A convergent obtained by terminating the continued fraction just before a large term is a close approximation to the limit of the continued fraction.

Semiconvergents

If

are consecutive convergents, then any fractions of the form

 

where  is an integer such that , are called semiconvergents, secondary convergents, or intermediate fractions. The -st semiconvergent equals the mediant of the -th one and the convergent . Sometimes the term is taken to mean that being a semiconvergent excludes the possibility of being a convergent (i.e.), rather than that a convergent is a kind of semiconvergent.

The consecutive semiconvergents  and  satisfy the property .

The converse is not true, however.

Best rational approximations

Truncate the continued fraction, and reduce its last term by a chosen amount (possibly zero).
The reduced term cannot have less than half its original value.
If the final term is even, half its value is admissible only if the corresponding semiconvergent is better than the previous convergent. (See below.)

For example, 0.84375 has continued fraction [0;1,5,2,2]. Here are all of its best rational approximations.

{| class="wikitable"
|- align="center"
! Continued fraction
|  [0;1]  ||  [0;1,3]  ||  [0;1,4]  ||  [0;1,5]  ||  [0;1,5,2]  ||  [0;1,5,2,1]  ||  [0;1,5,2,2] 
|- align="center"
! Rational approximation
| 1 ||  ||  ||  ||  ||  || 
|- align="center"
! Decimal equivalent
| 1 || 0.75 || 0.8 || ~0.83333 || ~0.84615 || ~0.84211 || 0.84375
|- align="center"
! Error
| +18.519% || −11.111% || −5.1852% || −1.2346% || +0.28490% || −0.19493% || 0%
|}

The strictly monotonic increase in the denominators as additional terms are included permits an algorithm to impose a limit, either on size of denominator or closeness of approximation.

The "half rule" mentioned above requires that when  is even, the halved term /2 is admissible if and only if   This is equivalent  to: .

.

Best rational within an interval 

where  and  have identical continued fraction expansions up through , a rational that falls within the interval  is given by the finite continued fraction,

This rational will be best in the sense that no other rational in  will have a smaller numerator or a smaller denominator.

For example, the decimal representation 3.1416 could be rounded from any number in the interval . The continued fraction representations of 3.14155 and 3.14165 are

and the best rational between these two is

Thus,  is the best rational number corresponding to the rounded decimal number 3.1416, in the sense that no other rational number that would be rounded to 3.1416 will have a smaller numerator or a smaller denominator.

Interval for a convergent 
A rational number, which can be expressed as finite continued fraction in two ways,

will be one of the convergents for the continued fraction expansion of a number, if and only if the number is strictly between (see this proof)
 and

It is the case that  when  is even, and  when  is odd.

For example, the number  has the continued fraction representations
 = [3; 7, 15, 1] = [3; 7, 16]
and thus  is a convergent of any number strictly between
{| cellpadding="2" cellspacing="0"
| align="right" |  |||| 
|-
| align="right" |  |||| 
|}

Comparison

[3;7,15,1,292,1,1,...] .

Let us suppose that the quotients found are, as above, [3;7,15,1]. The following is a rule by which we can write down at once the convergent fractions which result from these quotients without developing the continued fraction.

The first quotient, supposed divided by unity, will give the first fraction, which will be too small, namely, . Then, multiplying the numerator and denominator of this fraction by the second quotient and adding unity to the numerator, we shall have the second fraction, which will be too large. Multiplying in like manner the numerator and denominator of this fraction by the third quotient, and adding to the numerator the numerator of the preceding fraction, and to the denominator the denominator of the preceding fraction, we shall have the third fraction, which will be too small. Thus, the third quotient being 15, we have for our numerator , and for our denominator, . We proceed in the same manner for the fourth convergent. The fourth quotient being 1, we say 333 times 1 is 333, and this plus 22, the numerator of the fraction preceding, is 355; similarly, 106 times 1 is 106, and this plus 7 is 113.
In this manner, by employing the four quotients [3;7,15,1], we obtain the four fractions:

To sum up, the pattern is

The demonstration of the foregoing properties is deduced from the fact that if we seek the difference between one of the convergent fractions and the next adjacent to it we shall obtain a fraction of which the numerator is always unity and the denominator the product of the two denominators. The result being, that by employing this series of differences we can express in another and very simple manner the fractions with which we are here concerned, by means of a second series of fractions of which the numerators are all unity and the denominators successively be the product of every two adjacent denominators. Instead of the fractions written above, we have thus the series:

 +  −  +  − ...

The first term, as we see, is the first fraction; the first and second together give the second fraction, ; the first, the second and the third give the third fraction , and so on with the rest; the result being that the series entire is equivalent to the original value.

Generalized continued fraction

A generalized continued fraction is an expression of the form

where the an (n > 0) are the partial numerators, the bn are the partial denominators, and the leading term b0 is called the integer part of the continued fraction.

To illustrate the use of generalized continued fractions, consider the following example. The sequence of partial denominators of the simple continued fraction of  does not show any obvious pattern:

or

However, several generalized continued fractions for  have a perfectly regular structure, such as:

The first two of these are special cases of the arctangent function with  = 4 arctan (1) and the fourth and fifth one can be derived using the Wallis product.

Other continued fraction expansions

Periodic continued fractions

The numbers with periodic continued fraction expansion are precisely the irrational solutions of quadratic equations with rational coefficients; rational solutions have finite continued fraction expansions as previously stated. The simplest examples are the golden ratio φ = [1;1,1,1,1,1,...] and  = [1;2,2,2,2,...], while  = [3;1,2,1,6,1,2,1,6...] and  = [6;2,12,2,12,2,12...]. All irrational square roots of integers have a special form for the period; a symmetrical string, like the empty string (for ) or 1,2,1 (for ), followed by the double of the leading integer.

A property of the golden ratio φ
Because the continued fraction expansion for φ doesn't use any integers greater than 1, φ is one of the most "difficult" real numbers to approximate with rational numbers. Hurwitz's theorem  states that any irrational number  can be approximated by infinitely many rational  with

Regular patterns in continued fractions

which is a special case of this general expression for positive integer :

Another, more complex pattern appears in this continued fraction expansion for positive odd :

with a special case for :

Other continued fractions of this sort are

where  is a positive integer; also, for integer :

with a special case for :

If  is the modified, or hyperbolic, Bessel function of the first kind, we may define a function on the rationals  by

Then for all nonnegative rationals, we have

with similar formulas for negative rationals; in particular we have

Many of the formulas can be proved using Gauss's continued fraction.

Typical continued fractions
Most irrational numbers do not have any periodic or regular behavior in their continued fraction expansion. Paul Lévy showed that the th root of the denominator of the th convergent of the continued fraction expansion of almost all real numbers approaches an asymptotic limit, approximately 3.27582, which is known as Lévy's constant. Lochs' theorem states that th convergent of the continued fraction expansion of almost all real numbers determines the number to an average accuracy of just over  decimal places.

Applications

Square roots
Generalized continued fractions are used in a method for computing square roots.

The identity

leads via recursion to the generalized continued fraction for any square root:

Pell's equation
Continued fractions play an essential role in the solution of Pell's equation.

Dynamical systems
Continued fractions also play a role in the study of dynamical systems, where they tie together the Farey fractions which are seen in the Mandelbrot set with Minkowski's question mark function and the modular group Gamma.

The backwards shift operator for continued fractions is the map  called the Gauss map, which lops off digits of a continued fraction expansion: . The transfer operator of this map is called the Gauss–Kuzmin–Wirsing operator. The distribution of the digits in continued fractions is given by the zero'th eigenvector of this operator, and is called the Gauss–Kuzmin distribution.

Eigenvalues and eigenvectors
The Lanczos algorithm uses a continued fraction expansion to iteratively approximate the eigenvalues and eigenvectors of a large sparse matrix.

Networking applications 
Continued fractions have also been used in modelling optimization problems for wireless network virtualization to find a route between a source and a destination.

Examples of rational and irrational numbers

ra: rational approximant obtained by expanding continued fraction up to ar

History
 300 BCE Euclid's Elements contains an algorithm for the greatest common divisor, whose modern version generates a continued fraction as the sequence of quotients of successive Euclidean divisions that occur in it.
 499 The Aryabhatiya contains the solution of indeterminate equations using continued fractions
 1572 Rafael Bombelli, L'Algebra Opera – method for the extraction of square roots which is related to continued fractions
 1613 Pietro Cataldi, Trattato del modo brevissimo di trovar la radice quadra delli numeri – first notation for continued fractions
Cataldi represented a continued fraction as  &  &  &  with the dots indicating where the following fractions went.
 1695 John Wallis, Opera Mathematica – introduction of the term "continued fraction"
 1737 Leonhard Euler, De fractionibus continuis dissertatio – Provided the first then-comprehensive account of the properties of continued fractions, and included the first proof that the number e is irrational.
 1748 Euler, Introductio in analysin infinitorum. Vol. I, Chapter 18 – proved the equivalence of a certain form of continued fraction and a generalized infinite series, proved that every rational number can be written as a finite continued fraction, and proved that the continued fraction of an irrational number is infinite.
 1761 Johann Lambert – gave the first proof of the irrationality of  using a continued fraction for tan(x).
 1768 Joseph-Louis Lagrange – provided the general solution to Pell's equation using continued fractions similar to Bombelli's
 1770 Lagrange – proved that quadratic irrationals expand to periodic continued fractions.
 1813 Carl Friedrich Gauss, Werke, Vol. 3, pp. 134–138 – derived a very general complex-valued continued fraction via a clever identity involving the hypergeometric function
 1892 Henri Padé defined Padé approximant
 1972 Bill Gosper – First exact algorithms for continued fraction arithmetic.

See also
 Gaussian brackets
 
 
 Continued Logarithms

Notes

References

External links
 

 Linas Vepstas Continued Fractions and Gaps (2004) reviews chaotic structures in continued fractions.
 Continued Fractions on the Stern-Brocot Tree at cut-the-knot
 The Antikythera Mechanism I: Gear ratios and continued fractions
 Continued fraction calculator, WIMS.
 Continued Fraction Arithmetic Gosper's first continued fractions paper, unpublished. Cached on the Internet Archive's Wayback Machine
 
 Continued Fractions by Stephen Wolfram and Continued Fraction Approximations of the Tangent Function by Michael Trott, Wolfram Demonstrations Project.
 
 A view into "fractional interpolation" of a continued fraction } 
 Best rational approximation through continued fractions
 CONTINUED FRACTIONS by C. D. Olds

 
Mathematical analysis